Jean Preudhomme or Preud'ho(m)me or Prudhomme (baptised on 23 November 1732 in Rolle; buried on 20 July 1795 in La Neuveville) was a Swiss painter. He was a contemporary of the Swiss painters Anton Graff, Johann Jakob Schalch, Angelica Kauffman, Jakob Emanuel Handmann, Johann Caspar Füssli and his son Johann Heinrich Füssli.

Life and work 
Jean Preudhomme was a pupil of the well known painters Jean Baptiste Le Prince and Jean-Baptiste Greuze in Paris. He was a landscapist and an animal painter. However, his speciality was portrait painting. In Switzerland he was very popular with the landed gentry and the patricians in Geneva, Lausanne, Neuchâtel and Berne. In a Swiss publication, published between 1782 and 1786, he was described as a “portraitist à la mode”. Preudhomme's paintings, especially the portraits, are rare on the art market. His portrait of Franz Rudolf Frisching is one of his best known paintings.

Paintings in public collections 
Preudhomme's portrait of Douglas, 8th Duke of Hamilton, on his Grand Tour with his Physician Dr John Moore and the latter's son John, with a view of Geneva in the distance, is in the collection of the National Museums of Scotland. On his Grand Tour the Duke and his companions stayed for two years in Geneva.

A portrait of a Lady is in the collection of the Musée Rath.

Literature 
 Brun, Schweizerisches Künstlerlexikon

References

External links 

 
 Portrait of Douglas, 8th Duke of Hamilton, and his companions during their stay in Geneva. Painted by Jean Preudhomme in 1774

1732 births
1795 deaths
18th-century Swiss painters
18th-century Swiss male artists
Swiss male painters
Swiss portrait painters
People from Rolle